The Alexander III Commemorative egg is a jewelled enameled Easter egg made under the supervision of the Russian jeweller Peter Carl Fabergé in 1909, for Nicholas II of Russia, who presented it to his mother, the Dowager Empress Maria Feodorovna. 

The egg commemorates Alexander III of Russia, who had died fifteen years previously. The egg is one of three to commemorate Alexander, along with the Alexander III Portraits, and Alexander III Equestrian  eggs. The surprise was a miniature gold bust of Alexander.

The Alexander III Commemorative egg is one of the six Imperial Fabergé eggs that are currently missing; and one of only three lost eggs of which a photograph exists, the others being the 1889 Nécessaire and 1903's Royal Danish.

See also
Objet d'art
Egg decorating
List of missing treasure

References

Sources

Lost Fabergé eggs
1909 works
Alexander III of Russia